Liquid Dancers is an album by the Jimmy Giuffre 4, saxophonist Jimmy Giuffre, keyboardist Pete Levin, bassist Bob Nieske and drummer Randy Kaye, which was released on the Italian Soul Note label in 1991.

Track listing 
All compositions by Jimmy Giuffre
 "Liquid Dancers" – 4:30
 "Koko-Nut" – 4:47
 "Runnin' from the Rain" – 4:20
 "I Would" – 3:49
 "Move with the Times" – 3:55
 "Subway" – 6:25
 "Vision" – 3:35
 "The Teacher" – 4:12
 "If I Was" – 4:40

Personnel 
Jimmy Giuffre – tenor saxophone, soprano saxophone, clarinet, bass flute
Pete Levin – keyboards
Bob Nieske – electric bass
Randy Kaye – drums

References 

1991 albums
Jimmy Giuffre albums
Black Saint/Soul Note albums